Christmas beetle is a name commonly applied to the Australian beetle genus Anoplognathus. They are known as Christmas beetles because they are abundant in both urban and rural areas close to Christmas. Christmas beetles are large (20–30 mm long) members of the scarab family that are noisy and clumsy fliers, similar to the cockchafers of Europe. They typically have elytra that are dark or light brown, or green, while some species have a green-yellow iridescence.

The genus includes 35 species, several of which have been implicated in dieback of eucalypts. Anoplognathus pallidicollis is the species most commonly observed and associated with the name of Christmas beetle. However, there is a tendency for the name Christmas beetle to be used more ambiguously to refer to other metallic beetles not in this family, such as the stag beetle genus Lamprima. The smaller Argentine lawn beetle, Cyclocephala signaticollis, is prevalent in December and may also be referred to as a "Christmas beetle", labelled by the Australian Museum as an "impostor".

Species
Species include:

 Anoplognathus abnormis   
 Anoplognathus aeneus  
 Anoplognathus aureus   
 Anoplognathus blackdownensis 
 Anoplognathus boisduvalii  
 Anoplognathus brevicollis 
 Anoplognathus brunnipennis  
 Anoplognathus chloropyrus 
 Anoplognathus concolor  
 Anoplognathus daemeli 
 Anoplognathus flindersensis 
 Anoplognathus hirsutus
 Anoplognathus macalpinei  
 Anoplognathus macleayi
 Anoplognathus montanus  
 Anoplognathus multiseriatus  
 Anoplognathus narmarus
 Anoplognathus nebulosus
 Anoplognathus olivieri   
 Anoplognathus pallidicollis 
 Anoplognathus parvulus  
 Anoplognathus pindarus 
 Anoplognathus porosus  
 Anoplognathus prasinus
 Anoplognathus punctulatus  
 Anoplognathus rhinastus 
 Anoplognathus rothschildti  
 Anoplognathus rubiginosus
 Anoplognathus rugosus  
 Anoplognathus smaragdinus  
 Anoplognathus suturalis   
 Anoplognathus velutinus   
 Anoplognathus viridiaeneus 
 Anoplognathus viriditarsis

References

 Anoplognathus, ANIC Specimen Database. Australian National Insect Collection, CSIRO Entomology

Scarabaeidae
Beetles of Australia